Acanthurus blochii (ringtail surgeonfish) is a marine reef tang in the fish family Acanthuridae. The fish grow to a maximum length of 45 cm (18 in). It lives in the Indo-Pacific, with a depth range from 2–15 meters deep. Adults can be found in outer lagoons and seaweed reefs, in small groups, and feed on algae.

References

External links
 

Acanthuridae
Acanthurus
Fish of Hawaii
Taxa named by Achille Valenciennes
Fish described in 1835